Mia moglie torna a scuola is a 1981 commedia sexy all'italiana film directed by Giuliano Carnimeo and starring Renzo Montagnani with Carmen Russo, an early 1980s star of the genre.

Plot
Aristide Buratti (Montagnani) is a wealthy grocer married to attractive Valentina (Russo). Although they seem to have a happy marriage, Valentina feels herself culturally inferior because she is a high school drop out. Despite her husband's objections, she enrolls at a private boarding lycée for her maturità. Valentina thinks her natural charms will bring her success before the examination board and she inevitably becomes the centre of attraction for the school staff, particularly the nerdy teacher Pier Capponi (Enzo Robutti). On the other hand, Aristide gets increasingly jealous of Valentina. He now seeks to infiltrate the school in disguise and starts bribing the janitor (Toni Ucci) to serve this end.

Cast
Renzo Montagnani: Aristide Buratti
Carmen Russo: Valentina Buratti
Enzo Robutti: Pier Capponi
Toni Ucci: Gustavo, the janitor
Marisa Merlini: principal
Cinzia De Ponti: Giulia

References

External links

Mia moglie torna a scuola at Variety Distribution

1981 films
Commedia sexy all'italiana
Italian high school films
Films directed by Giuliano Carnimeo
1980s sex comedy films
1981 comedy films
1980s Italian-language films
1980s Italian films